Thomas Antonius Middendorp (born 6 September 1960) is a retired general of the Royal Netherlands Army. He served as Chief of Defence of the Armed forces of the Netherlands from 28 June 2012 until 3 October 2017. He previously served as the Commander of Task Force Uruzgan part of the International Security Assistance Force from 2 February 2009 until 3 August 2009.

Early life 
Thomas Middendorp was born on 6 September 1960 in Rheden in the Province of Gelderland.

Military career 
Middendorp joined the Dutch Army in 1979, attending officers training at the Koninklijke Militaire Academie in Breda. Opting to join the Engineering Corps, he followed up his academy training with an additional one-year course at the Engineering Training Centre in Vught.

Having completed his training, Middendorp was posted to Ermelo in 1984 where he was given command of an armored engineering unit. He held this command for two years, after which (in 1986) he was transferred to Breda. He was posted to the Defence Real Estate Management Agency regional directorate as head of the project management agency. In 1989 he was transferred to the Dutch Army base in Seedorf, where he assumed the command of the B company, 41st Engineering Battalion.

From 1992 to 1994 Middendorp attended Command School : Hogere Militaire Vorming. Following this training he was posted to the Army staff and put in charge of developing and implementing new real estate management policy in light of the deactivation of the Dutch draft. Completing this posting Middendorp attended the United States Army Command and General Staff College starting in 1996.

In 1997 Middendorp was assigned the post of military assistant to the Deputy Chief of the Netherlands Defence Staff. Following this posting he was reassigned to Münster in 1999, as chief of the National Planning Bureau for the I. German/Dutch Corps. He held this post until 2001, when he was given command of the 101 Engineering Battalion in Wezep. As first commander of this battalion he was responsible for setting up the battalion and during the next 2.5 years commanded it through missions in Bosnia-Hercegovina, the Republic of Macedonia and Iraq.

Following this command, Middendorp was promoted to Colonel and posted to the Ministry of Defence as policy coordinator for the Chief Director of General Affairs. In this posting he advised the minister of defence on national deployment of the armed forces and established several cooperation agreements between the Ministry of Defence and other ministries.

Towards the end of 2006, Middendorp was posted overseas for his first tour in Afghanistan, as Senior Political Advisor and Deputy NATO Senior Civil Representative (SCR). Mid-2007 he did a short stint with the Dutch Army Command as head of the Command Support Department; he was given command of the 13th Mechanised Brigade in Oirschot on 11 January 2008.

He was posted back to Afghanistan in February 2009 as commanding officer of the multinational Task Force Uruzgan (TFU6, specifically). Returning to the Netherlands he was promoted to Major-General in August 2009, and was appointed Director of Operations of the Royal Netherlands Defence Staff on 24 December.

The Minister of Defence announced Middendorp's selection as next Chief of Defence on 28 September 2011. In preparation for his new role, Middendorp was promoted Lieutenant general on 1 January 2012 and placed in charge of projects and operations at the Defence Staff. He was promoted Four-star general on 28 June 2012, the date on which general Peter van Uhm transferred command of the Netherlands Defence Staff to him.

On 28 February 2017 Middendorp was appointed an honorary Officer of the Order of Australia (AO). He was invested by the Governor General of Australia Sir Peter Cosgrove.

On 11 January 2018 King Willem-Alexander of the Netherlands appointed Middendorp as adjutant in extraordinary service of the King.

Resignation
Middendorp resigned on 3 October 2017 following the publication of a critical report into the death of two Dutch soldiers in a training accident in Mali and the resignation of Minister of Defence Jeanine Hennis-Plasschaert. Lieutenant admiral Rob Bauer took on as Chief of Defence.

References

External links

Official

  

1960 births
Living people
Chiefs of Defence (Netherlands)
Dutch expatriates in Germany
Dutch expatriates in the United States
Dutch military personnel of the War in Afghanistan (2001–2021)
Graduates of the Koninklijke Militaire Academie
Royal Netherlands Army generals
Royal Netherlands Army officers
People from Rheden
Honorary Officers of the Order of Australia